Sueño Contigo is a Venezuelan telenovela written by Pilar Romero and produced by Venevisión in 1988. Elluz Peraza and José Luis Rodríguez star as the protagonists . with José Luis Rodríguez singing the theme song for the telenovela.

Cast
Elluz Peraza as Silvia Patricia Hermida
José Luis Rodríguez as Jorge Leonardo Riera
Rafael Briceño as Alejandro Hermida
América Alonso as Margarita de Riera
Chelo Rodríguez as Fabiana
Luis Gerardo Núñez as Agustín Riera
Elba Escobar as Livia Noriega
María Cristina Lozada as Aurora
Esperanza Magaz as Aurora de Hermida
Francisco Ferrari as Héctor Riera
Chela D'Gar as Felicidad
Jose Cristancho as Piolin

References

External links
 

1988 telenovelas
Venevisión telenovelas
Venezuelan telenovelas
Spanish-language telenovelas
1988 Venezuelan television series debuts
1988 Venezuelan television series endings
Television shows set in Venezuela